The olive tree is a small tree in the family Oleaceae.

Olive tree may also refer to:

Arts, entertainment, and media

Films
 The Olive Tree (1975 film), an Australian TV movie
 The Olive Tree (2016 film), a 2016 film directed by Icíar Bollaín

Songs
 "The Olive Tree", a 1953 American song from the 1953 musical Kismet 
 "The Olive Tree", a 1967 song written by Diane Lampert and Tom Springfield and performed by Dusty Springfield on her BBC show in 1966, and Judith Durham in 1967
 "The Olive Tree", a 1979 Taiwanese song (橄欖樹) by Chyi Yu
 "The Olive Tree", a song by Scale the Summit from the album The Migration

Politics
Olive Tree (Greece), a centre-left electoral alliance in Greece
 The Olive Tree (Italy), a former centre-left political coalition in Italy

Religion
 Olive Tree Bible Software, an electronic publisher of Bible versions, study tools, and Christian eBooks for mobile devices
 Olive Tree Theology, a Christian theological movement
 Olive Tree (religious movement), a Korean new religious movement